Galma  is a village in the country of India. It is located in the Darbhanga district of Bihar in the Ghanshyampur block under the subdivision of Bihar.

References

Villages in Darbhanga district